Maurizio Jacobacci (born 11 January 1963) is a Swiss professional football manager of 1860 Munich and former player.

Managerial career
On 18 June 2021, Jacobacci was announced as the new manager of Ligue 2 side, Grenoble. In February 2023, he was appointed as new head coach of 1860 Munich.

Personal life
Jacobacci was born in Switzerland and is of Italian descent.

References

External links

1963 births
Living people
Footballers from Bern
Swiss people of Italian descent
Swiss men's footballers
Association football forwards
BSC Young Boys players
Neuchâtel Xamax FCS players
AC Bellinzona players
FC Wettingen players
Servette FC players
FC St. Gallen players
FC Lausanne-Sport players
Swiss Super League players
Swiss Challenge League players
Swiss football managers
FC Chiasso managers
SR Delémont managers
FC Baden managers
FC Wil managers
FC Vaduz managers
FC Sion managers
SC Kriens managers
FC Schaffhausen managers
FC Wacker Innsbruck (2002) managers
AC Bellinzona managers
FC Lugano managers
TSV 1860 Munich managers
Grenoble Foot 38 managers
Swiss Super League managers
Swiss Challenge League managers
Ligue 2 managers
Swiss expatriate football managers
Swiss expatriate sportspeople in Liechtenstein
Swiss expatriate sportspeople in Austria
Swiss expatriate sportspeople in France
Swiss expatriate sportspeople in Germany
Expatriate football managers in Liechtenstein
Expatriate football managers in Austria
Expatriate football managers in France
Expatriate football managers in Germany